The Muskoka River is a river in the Muskoka District of Ontario, Canada. The river is the third largest river draining the southern Ontario land mass by average annual flow.

It rises in the highlands of Algonquin Park and flows southwest through a number of lakes including
Lake Muskoka
Lake Joseph
Lake Rosseau
Lake of Bays
which empty into Georgian Bay south of Parry Sound by way of the Moon and Musquash Rivers.

Tributaries include the:
 Indian River
 Hollow River
 Oxtongue River
 Buck River
 East River

Communities on the river include:
Bracebridge, Ontario
Huntsville, Ontario

The name "Muskoka" comes from the name of a chief of the Ojibwa in this region, "Mesqua Ukee" (Miskwaa-aki: Red Earth).

In fiction
There is also a Muskoka River in Nancy Drew's fictional home town of River Heights, located somewhere in the Midwestern United States.

See also
List of Ontario rivers

References

Rivers of Muskoka District